The term Domiciano may refer to:

The Latin name of Domitian (51 – 96 AD), a Roman Emperor of the Flavian dynasty
Domiciano Cavém (1932 – 2005), a Portuguese footballer
Liriel Domiciano (b. 1981), a Brazilian singer
Domiciano Santana, one of the founders of the Brazilian city Avaré

See also
Domitian (disambiguation)